The Cumberland Subdivision is a railroad line owned and operated by CSX Transportation in the U.S. states of Maryland and West Virginia. The line runs from Brunswick, Maryland, west to Cumberland, Maryland,  along the old Baltimore and Ohio Rail Road (B&O) main line. At its east end, the Cumberland Subdivision becomes the Metropolitan Subdivision; at its west end at Cumberland, Maryland it becomes the Cumberland Terminal Subdivision. It meets the Shenandoah Subdivision at Harpers Ferry, West Virginia, and the Lurgan Subdivision at Cherry Run, West Virginia.

History

The Cumberland Subdivision was opened in 1842 as part of the B&O's main line.

In 1914 the B&O opened the Magnolia Cutoff, a more direct route through mountain ridges, running  between Hansrote and Paw Paw, West Virginia. The project included construction of four tunnels, two bridges, and many deep rock cuts. The B&O continued to use the original route along the Potomac River, called the "Lowline," until 1961.

In 1987 the subdivision and the rest of the B&O system were merged into CSX.

Current operation
The Cumberland Subdivision supports freight and passenger traffic, with frequent runs of intermodal, autoracks, coal unit trains and mixed freights, and Amtrak's Capitol Limited. The MARC Brunswick Line commuter trains stop at Martinsburg, Duffields, Harpers Ferry, and points east, terminating in Washington, D.C.

See also
 List of CSX Transportation lines

References

CSX Transportation lines
Transportation in Cumberland, MD-WV-PA
Rail infrastructure in Maryland
Rail infrastructure in West Virginia
Baltimore and Ohio Railroad lines